This article details the Bradford Bulls rugby league football club's 2012 season, the seventeenth season of the Super League era.

Season Review

July 2011

Bradford Bulls announce the signing of NRL centre Keith Lulia from the Newcastle Knights on a 2-year deal. Also veteran winger Gareth Raynor signed a 1-year extension keeping him at the Bulls for the 2012 season. Raynor was later released for a severe breach of club discipline. Harlequins RL halfback Luke Gale signed a 2-year deal with Bradford making him the second new face at Odsal for 2012. Crusaders withdrew their Super League application and as a result the Bulls swooped for halfback Jarrod Sammut on a 1 Year Contract.

August 2011

The Bulls announce that winger and top point scorer Patrick Ah Van signed a 2 Year Contract with Super League newcomers Widnes Vikings. Also another new signing was announced in the form of Aussie centre/winger Adrian Purtell from Penrith Panthers on a 3-year deal. Winger Shaun Ainscough signed a new 1 Year Deal with the Bulls while fullback Shad Royston is set to join Pia Donkeys in the French league for 2012. Bradford have promoted 18-year-old back rower Jobe Murphy to their first team squad for 2012.

September 2011

Former Great Britain centre Chev Walker signed a 1-year extension to stay with the Bulls for 2012. Gareth Raynor was released from the remaining year on his contract while club captain Andy Lynch was sold to Hull F.C. for a 6 figure sum, on a 2-year contract.

October 2011

Young promising winger Vinny Finigan signs a 1 Year Deal at the Sheffield Eagles after being frozen out of the Bulls first team by Mick Potter, however the Bulls announce they have secured a fifth signing in the form of highly rated ex-Crusaders winger Elliot Kear on a 3 Year Deal. Parramatta Eels forward Manase Manuokafoa signs a 1 Year Deal with the Bulls following Mick Potter's trip to Australia. Academy product Steve Crossley joined Dewsbury Rams on a permanent deal while youngster Cain Southernwood joins the Rams on a year-long loan. Dewsbury also announce that they are playing the Bulls is a pre-season friendly on 22 January 2012 at Rams Stadium. Another pre-season game was announced for 15 January 2012 against reigning Championship winners Featherstone Rovers at Post Office Road. On the last day of October another two friendlies are announced, the first will be played on Boxing Day against Castleford Tigers at Wheldon Road while the last friendly will be on 27 or 29 January 2012 depending when the season starts, this friendly will be at the KC Stadium against Hull F.C. for Lee Radford's testimonial.

November 2011

The Bulls go back to training and the overseas players join the 2012 Bulls squad for the first time. Bradford release their squad numbers for the 2012 season with Brett Kearney getting the number 1 shirt while Ben Jeffries will wear number 6. The new number 7 was revealed as Luke Gale. The 2012 fixtures were released and it revealed that the Bulls would start their campaign at Odsal Stadium against the Catalans Dragons and they would finish their season against the same opponent at Stade Gilbert Brutus. The 2012 Home shirt was released on the 26th.

December 2011

Local Championship side Keighley Cougars announce another pre-season friendly against the Bulls on 27 January at Cougar Park. The Bulls travelled to Castleford Tigers on Boxing Day to play their annual friendly, however things didn't start well for the Bulls as new signing Manase Manuokafoa was injured in the warm up. Jason Crookes, Chev Walker, Bryn Hargreaves and Shaun Ainscough all scored for the Bulls with Kyle Briggs kicking 1 goal from 4 attempts, however it was not enough and Castleford won the game 28–18.

January 2012

Gareth Raynor signed a 1-year contract with Championship winners Featherstone Rovers for the 2012 season. The Bulls announce that former player Karl Pryce has returned from the club on a 1 Year Deal from Wigan Warriors the 25-year-old can play Wing, Centre and Second Row, he was given the number 33 shirt. The friendly against Featherstone was cancelled due to a frozen pitch. The Bulls beat local Championship side Dewsbury Rams 42–16, Adrian Purtell scored a try on his debut and Luke Gale scored 2 tries, Shaun Ainscough, trialist Phil Joseph, Tom Burgess and Paul Sykes also scored. Gale kicked 7 goals. It was announced on the 25th that hookers Heath L'Estrange and Matt Diskin would share the captain's armband for the 2012 season, also the 2012 Away shirt was revealed. Another big story in January was that Rugby League's governing body, the Rugby Football League (RFL) had bought the lease to Odsal Stadium for defensive reasons, they currently rent the ground to the Bulls. An Under 20's side featuring Ainscough, Danny Addy and Kyle Briggs lost 28–12 to a full strength Keighley Cougars, youngster Johnny Payne and Briggs both scored tries whilst Briggs kicked 2 goals. An under strength Bulls side travelled to the KC Stadium to play in Lee Radford's testimonial game. A full strength Hull F.C. side won 46–6 with Bradford's sole try coming from a 90m effort from Jason Crookes with Gale kicking the goal.

February 2012

The Bulls start their 2012 campaign with a 34–12 loss to the Catalans Dragons, the Bulls were 20–0 down at halftime before tries from Jamie Langley and Elliot Kear got them on the scoreboard. Luke Gale kicked 2 goals from the touchline. Kyle Briggs was once again loaned out however this time he was sent to his former club Featherstone Rovers for the season. The return of Elliott Whitehead certainly helped lift the Bulls in defence as they put in a very huge defensive effort to beat Castleford Tigers 20–12. Jarrod Sammut opened the scoring with further tries coming from Tom Burgess and Brett Kearney, Gale kicked 4 goals. The Bulls were destroyed by Challenge Cup holders Wigan Warriors, the Warriors won the game 54–16 with Jason Crookes, Sammut and Kearney scoring and Sammut kicked 2 goals after Gale was helped off the pitch. The Bulls carried on their 100% away win record with a hard-fought 36–18 victory against Wakefield Trinity Wildcats, former Wildcat Ben Jeffries kicked Wakefield to death and Elliott Whitehead scored a hat-trick, Brett Kearney scored two and Keith Lulia scored his first try for the Bulls. Sammut kicked all six goals.

March 2012

The Bulls started off March with a very impressive performance against league leaders Warrington Wolves, the Bulls were the better side for the majority of the game with John Bateman and Manase Manuokafoa both impressing however they could not prevent a controversial 23–10 loss with Matt Diskin and Jason Crookes scoring and Jarrod Sammut kicking a goal. The Bulls staged an impressive fightback from 24–8 down to beat Hull Kingston Rovers 36–24 with Crookes grabbing his hat-trick, Karl Pryce, Diskin, Brett Kearney and Keith Lulia also scored with Sammut kicking 4 goals. Bradford got their first home win against a St. Helens side struggling for form, however it was no easy task as the Bulls and Saints players ran their blood to water but the Bulls defence stood firm and they ground out a 12–8 win (their first win over Saints since 2009) with Elliott Whitehead crossing for an 8-point try after Jamie Foster kicked him and early in the second half Karl Pryce crossed for a try, returning Paul Sykes kicked 2 from 3. Youngster Elliott Whitehead signed a new 5 Year Deal to stay with the club until at least 2016. After a good few games the Bulls reverted to their old ways and lost to Salford City Reds 38–18 with Kearney, Whitehead and Bryn Hargreaves scoring and the returning Sammut kicking 3 goals. The Bulls were hit with a massive financial blow when the RBS limited their overdraft leaving the Bulls with no cash, with no other option Peter Hood turned an asked the fans to help out by donating money to the club. Also Paul Sykes joined Wakefield Trinity Wildcats on a season long loan. The Bulls put up a spirited display against 2nd place Hull F.C. however despite being the better side for most of the match Hull came away with a lucky 24–18 win, Lulia, Pryce and youngster John Bateman all scored tries with Sammut kicking all 3 goals.

April 2012

The Bulls started April off with a win against rivals Leeds Rhinos, Bradford won the game 12–4 with Jamie Langley and Ben Jeffries scoring a try each and Jarrod Sammut kicked both goals. Bradford backed up the victory over Leeds with a 38–4 win against new boys Widnes Vikings, Jeffries crossed for an early try and Michael Platt scored 2, Craig Kopczak, Adrian Purtell, Manase Manuokafoa and Keith Lulia also scored tries, Sammut kicked 4 goals and Danny Addy kicked the final goal. The Bulls booked their place in the Challenge Cup 5th Round by brushing aside Championship 1 club Doncaster 72–6, Shaun Ainscough and Elliott Whitehead both scored hat-tricks, Lulia and Matt Diskin both scored 2 a piece whilst Jeffries, John Bateman and Kopczak all scored. Addy kicked 10 goals. Bradford lost 20–6 to league leaders Huddersfield Giants, the conditions were extremely poor and a depleted Bulls side battled well and defended extremely well but Danny Brough proved to be the difference. Platt scored the only Bradford try and Addy converted. Bradford were dumped out of the Challenge Cup by heavily favoured Warrington Wolves however the Bulls battled bravely before finally losing 32–16 with Purtell, Lulia and Olivier Elima all scoring and Luke Gale kicking 2 goals on his return.

May 2012

Young hooker Adam O'Brien signs a new 5-year deal with the club. The Bulls travelled down to London Broncos and secured a hard-fought 29–22 win with Karl Pryce scoring a try and Michael Platt scoring 4. Luke Gale kicked 4 goals and a drop goal to put them 3 points clear of 9th place and on level points with Leeds Rhinos. Bradford drew against Salford City Reds 20–20 with Pryce scoring a hat-trick and Tom Burgess also scoring, Gale kicked 2 goals. The Bulls lose yet again at the Magic Weekend to rivals Leeds Rhinos 37–22, Elliott Whitehead, Ben Jeffries, Matt Diskin and Elliot Kear all scored for Bradford and Gale kicked 3 goals. Chairman Peter Hood officially stood down and his predecessor Chris Caisley took on the role.

June 2012

Bradford kicked off June with a 46–32 win against Castleford Tigers. Keith Lulia, John Bateman and Olivier Elima all scored a try each whilst Brett Kearney scored 2 and Shaun Ainscough scored a hat-trick, Luke Gale also got on the scoresheet kicking 7 goals. Bradford suffered an embarrassing 54–0 loss at the hands of St Helens R.F.C. After a week's break, due to the International Origin, the Bulls bounced back and beat fellow playoff competitors Wakefield Trinity Wildcats 34–26, Elliott Whitehead, Ainscough and Elima all scored a try each whilst Lulia scored 2, Gale kicked all 5 conversions and two penalty goals. Due to the major financial crisis at the club the Bulls officially went into administration on 26 June 2012. Bradford managed to record a phenomenal 30–22 win over league leaders Wigan Warriors at the DW Stadium, 2 tries from former Warrior Karl Pryce, and a try each for Lulia, Kearney and Whitehead won the game whilst Gale kicked all 5 goals.

July 2012

On 2 July the administrators officially sacked the entire coaching staff including Head Coach Mick Potter, Assistants Lee St Hilaire and Francis Cummins and also Head of Youth Development Paul Medley. Bradford easily beat bottom of the table London Broncos 44–12 with Manase Manuokafoa, Elliott Whitehead, Luke Gale and Michael Platt all scored a try each whilst Brett Kearney scored 4 tries and Gale added 6 goals. The Bulls lost to arch rivals Leeds Rhinos 34–16 with Whitehead, Olivier Elima and Karl Pryce scoring tries whilst Gale kicked 2 goals. Bradford were also handed a 6-point deduction for entering administration which puts them out of the playoff places. The Bulls wrapped up July with a 50–22 loss to Warrington Wolves, Danny Addy scored 2 tries whilst Whitehead and Pryce also crossed and Gale kicked 3 goals.

August 2012

Bradford started August with a win in a must win game after their 6-point deduction. They beat Widnes Vikings 38–26 with Michael Platt and Shaun Ainscough both scoring 2 tries each and Brett Kearney, Ben Jeffries and Heath L'Estrange all added to the total with a try each. Scrum Half Luke Gale kicked 5 goals. It was announced that youngster Tom Burgess would join his brothers Sam Burgess, Luke Burgess and George Burgess at NRL team South Sydney Rabbitohs for the 2013 season. Bradford received a massive boost to their playoff hopes with a 32–26 win over 8th place Hull Kingston Rovers, this means that the Bulls go level on points with them with 3 games left to play. Jamie Langley crossed for a rare double whilst Ainscough, Jason Crookes and Elliott Whitehead also scored whilst Gale kicked 6 goals. The Bulls once again overcame the odds and beat fellow Yorkshiremen Huddersfield Giants 34–12, Ainscough scored his first try away from home and Matt Diskin, Gale, and Kearney all scored a try whilst returning Karl Pryce grabbed a double. Gale added 5 goals and put Bradford back into the playoff places.

September 2012

It was announced that Omar Khan and MP Gerry Sutcliffe would become new owners of the Bulls after paying £150,000 to secure the ownership. Not long after the Bulls went to suffer a massive 70–6 loss to Hull F.C. with only Jason Crookes scoring a try for Bradford whilst Luke Gale kicked the goal. Ben Jeffries announced that he would be returning to Australia at the end of the season to become a miner and play part-time with the Kurri Kurri Bulldogs. In addition to Jeffries leaving, former Salford player Ian Sibbit announces that he will retire at the end of the year. Second Rower Olivier Elima also announced he would leave at the end of the season to join former club Catalans Dragons on a 2-year deal, this came as no surprise as Elima had already stated he wanted to go home so his kid could go to a French school. A minor departure was Craig Kopczak, he refused to have his contract transferred over to Omar Khan's Bulls so it was automatically terminated, he looks set to sign for Huddersfield Giants. The Bulls wrap up their weekly rounds with a 50–26 loss to Catalans Dragons, the loss means that they are 1 point behind 8th placed Wakefield Trinity Wildcats and this makes it the 4th year in a row that the Bulls have failed to make the playoffs.

2012 Milestones

Round 1: Luke Gale, Adrian Purtell, Elliot Kear and Jarrod Sammut made their debuts for the Bulls.
Round 1: Elliot Kear scored his 1st try for the Bulls.
Round 1: Luke Gale kicked his 1st goal for the Bulls.
Round 2: Jarrod Sammut scored his 1st try for the Bulls.
Round 3: Keith Lulia and Phil Joseph made their debuts for the Bulls.
Round 3: Jason Crookes scored his 1st try for the Bulls.
Round 3: Jarrod Sammut kicked his 1st goal for the Bulls.
Round 4: Brett Kearney and Heath L'Estrange made their 50th appearance for the Bulls.
Round 4: Keith Lulia scored his 1st try for the Bulls.
Round 4: Brett Kearney scored his 25th try and reached 100 points for the Bulls.
Round 4: Elliott Whitehead scored his 2nd hat-trick for the Bulls.
Round 5: Manase Manuokafoa made his debut for the Bulls.
Round 6: Karl Pryce made his debut in his 2nd stint with the Bulls.
Round 6: Karl Pryce scored his 1st try in his 2nd stint at the Bulls.
Round 6: Jason Crookes scored his 1st hat-trick for the Bulls.
Round 8: Paul Sykes made his 100th appearance in his 2nd stint with the Bulls.
Round 8: Bryn Hargreaves scored his 1st try for the Bulls.
Round 11: Adrian Purtell scored his 1st try for the Bulls.
Round 11: Manase Manuokafoa scored his 1st try for the Bulls.
CCR4: Callum Windley made his debut for the Bulls.
CCR4: Elliott Whitehead scored his 3rd hat-trick for the Bulls.
CCR4: Elliott Whitehead scored his 25th try and reached 100 points for the Bulls.
CCR4: Shaun Ainscough scored his 1st hat-trick for the Bulls.
Round 13: Michael Platt scored his 1st four-try haul and his 3rd hat-trick for the Bulls.
Round 13: Luke Gale kicked his 1st drop goal for the Bulls.
Round 14: Karl Pryce scored his 3rd hat-trick for the Bulls.
Round 16: Shaun Ainscough scored his 2nd hat-trick for the Bulls.
Round 20: Brett Kearney scored his 1st four-try haul and his 1st hat-trick for the Bulls.
Round 20: Luke Gale scored his 1st try for the Bulls.
Round 23: Luke Gale reached 100 points for the Bulls.
Round 23: Bryn Hargreaves made his 50th appearance for the Bulls.
Round 27: Jarrod Sammut scored his 1st four-try haul and 1st hat-trick for the Bulls.

Pre Season Friendlies

Bulls score is first.

Player Appearances
Friendly Games Only

 = Injured

 = Suspended

Table

2012 Fixtures and Results

2012 Stobart Super League

Player Appearances
Super League Only

 = Injured

 = Suspended

Challenge Cup

Player Appearances
Challenge Cup Games only

2012 Squad Statistics

 Appearances and points include (Super League, Challenge Cup and Play-offs) as of 8 September 2012.

 = Injured
 = Suspended

2012 Transfers In/Out

In

Out

References

Notes

External links
Bradford Bulls Website
Bradford Bulls in T&A
Bradford Bulls on Sky Sports
Bradford on Super League Site
Red,Black And Amber
BBC Sport-Rugby League 

Bradford Bulls seasons
Bradford Bulls